This is a family tree of the Bavandid rulers, and their ancestors.

Family Tree

See also
 Sasanian family tree

Sources 
 
 
 
 

Family trees